The Ghana Academy of Arts and Sciences (GAAS) is a learned society for the arts and sciences based in Accra, Ghana. The institution was founded in November 1959 by Kwame Nkrumah with the aim to promote the pursuit, advancement and dissemination of knowledge in all branches of the sciences and the humanities.

History
The Ghana Academy of Arts and Sciences began its life as the Ghana Academy of Learning, and was formally opened on 27 November 1959 by Prince Philip, Duke of Edinburgh, at the Great Hall of the University College of Ghana, who became its first president along with Nkrumah. It was incorporated by an Act of Parliament, the first of its kind in post-independent Africa. It was merged with the National Research Council in 1963 to become the Academy of Arts and Sciences. In 1968 it was again split into (a) The Ghana Academy of Arts and Sciences, which is a purely learned society, and (b) The Council for Scientific and Industrial Research (CSIR), which undertakes research of an applied nature related to national needs.

Mission
The mission of the Ghana Academy of Arts and Sciences is to encourage the creation, acquisition, dissemination and utilization of knowledge for national development through the promotion of learning.

Presidents
 The following individuals have served as President of the Academy:

Fellows 
Fellows

The society's members are elected fellows, who are entitled to use FGA as post-nominal letters. A General Assembly of Fellows may elect as a Fellow any Ghanaian national or resident who, in the Council's judgement, has significantly contributed to any field of the arts or sciences. A list of current fellows is maintained online by the GAAS.

Honorary fellow

The Council may elect as an honorary fellow any person of eminence in the arts or sciences who is not a Ghanaian citizen and has made significant contributions to the advancement of the arts or sciences.

Notable Fellows

External links
Official site

References

Scientific organisations based in Ghana
Education in Accra
Organizations established in 1959
National academies
Members of the International Council for Science
1959 establishments in Ghana
Members of the International Science Council